The Colisée Jean-Béliveau (originally known as Aréna Jacques-Cartier) is a multi-purpose arena built in 1966 in Longueuil, Quebec, and home to the ice hockey team of Le Collège Français de Longueuil, that play in the Quebec Junior AAA Hockey League. The arena was originally named Aréna Jacques-Cartier, but renamed in 1971 in honour of former hockey great, Jean Béliveau to mark his 500th career goal.

It has 2,400 seats, and a total capacity of 2,600 with standing room. It previously hosted two ice hockey teams in the Quebec Major Junior Hockey League, the Longueuil Chevaliers (1982–87) and the Longueuil Collège Français (1988–91).

The original plans were conceived by the architects Major and Gagnon, then completed by consulting engineers Lalonde, Girouard & Letendre, and was built by the firm Désourdy (now named Construction DJL inc.).  It was built at a cost of $924,000.

References

Indoor ice hockey venues in Quebec
Indoor arenas in Quebec
Sports venues in Quebec
Quebec Major Junior Hockey League arenas
Buildings and structures in Longueuil
Sport in Longueuil